R. Sathyanarayana (9 May 1927 – 16 January 2020) was a musicologist and dance scholar from Mysore, India. In 2018, Sathyanarayana received the Padma Shri civilian honour from the President of India for his contribution to the field of music.

Education 
Dr R Sathyanarayana or Mahamahopadhyaya Dr R Sathyanarayana, as he was known in the scholarly circles, was erudite. His degrees ranged from a Master's in chemistry from the University of Mysore to a PhD and multiple D.Litt. degrees from various universities, including (but not exclusively) Mysore University, Hampi University (Honoris Causa) and Gangubhai Hangal Music University of Mysore.

Academic record

Professional experience 
 Teaching chemistry: 1949–1984, Karnataka Music: 1945–1984
 Teaching musicology and danceology: 1951–2020

Academic distinctions 

 D.Litt. First interdisciplinary award, Mysore University,
 D.Litt. (Honoris Causa) IKSV University, Khairagarh, M.P.
 Indira Gandhi National Fellowship for Arts
 Senior Fellow, Ministry for Tourism and Culture, New Delhi.
 Certificate of Honour: International Biographical Centre, Cambridge.
 Golden Jubilee Award, Mysore University, for highest creative research in Fine Arts and Languages (three times)
 Highest Award for lecture Demonstration, 53rd Music Conference, Music Academy, Madras.
 Fellow, Member etc. of numerous learned bodies in India and Abroad

Career 
Between 1949 and 1984, he taught chemistry at the Sarada Vilas College, and also taught Karnataka music. He wrote treatises in Sanskrit language on dance and music. Pundarikamala, Shruti: The Scalic Foundation, Suladis and Ugabhogas of Karnataka Music, and Karnataka Sangeetha Vahini were some of his notable works. He was a public speaker on Indological disciplines, and was an active participant in Government of India sponsored music festivals and international seminars. He was the President of the Indian Music Congress.

Cultural delegations 

 One-Man Cultural Mission to Europe and UK, sponsored by Government of India.
 Leader of Government of India Delegation of Musicians and Musicologists to International Seminar on Indian Music at London sponsored by Government of India and UK University Circuit for Indian Classical Music.
 Delegation of Musicologists to USSR for Festival of India in Moscow for Seminar on Indian Music.
 Delegation of Musicologists to Festival of USSR in Delhi for Seminar on Indian Music.
 Delegation of Musicologists to China, Singapore and Malaysia by Government of India.

Participation 

 Participation in other conferences and seminars on Indian Music abroad.
 President, Director, Coordinator, Moderator at numerous conferences on music and dance.
 Chairman of council of Experts committee of numerous conferences on music and dance.
 Keynote address and papers presented at conferences, seminars, workshops on Indian music and dance.
 Papers presented at conferences and seminars on Agama, Purana, Ayurveda (Indian medicine), Astrology, Yoga Shastra, Mantra Shastra, Psychology and Acoustics in relation to Indian music and dance.

Service and positions held 
 Close associations with many organizations devoted to the promotion of Indian music and Dance and of Indian Culture in several capacities.
 President Nupura School of Dance and Nityanrutya, National Dance Festival.
 Director, Regional Centre for Research and Development in Music and Dance (Sangeetha Nrtya Academy) Centre for Musical Research, Kayavarohan Teertha Samaj.
 Member of executive committee of several organizations.
 Professor of Musicology, Sri Varalakshmi Academy.
 Member, advisory committee for dictionaries, encyclopaedias and other lexical works.
 All India Radio: Member of Programme Advisory Committee, Recruitment committee, Jury for Annual National Awards.
 University Grants Commission: Member, Visiting Committee.
 Ex.Member, Karnataka Sangita Nrutya Academy.
 Member: Ph.D. committee, Board of Studies in Performing Arts, Board of examiners, Examiner for post graduate and Ph.D. examinations in music of several Universities, Guide for Ph.D.
 Society for Indian Classical Music and Dance: Member of Steering Group, Action Committee.
 Syndicate member of Karnataka State Gangubai Hanagal Music and Performing Arts University, Mysore
 President: Indian Music Congress
 Advisory Committee, Percussive Arts Centre.
 Founder Director, Srividya Pratishthaan, Foundation to Preserve, Perpetuate and Disseminate the Knowledge of Srividya Tantra.
 Several other art institutions all over India and abroad in various capacities

Books written

Critical edition of Sanskrit treatises on music and dance 

 Abhinava Bharata Sarasangraha of Mummadi Chikkabhupala
 Sangeetharatnakara of Sharngadeva
 Sangeethasudhakara of Haripaladeva 
 Ragarathnakara of Gandharvaraja 
 Chaturdandi Prakashika of Venkatamakhin
 Ragalakshanam of Mudduventkatamakhin
 Veenalakshana of Parameshvara
 Sadragachandrodaya of Pandarika Vitthala
 Ragamala of Pandarika Vitthala
 Ragamanjari of Pandarika Vitthala
 Nartananirnaya of Pandarika Vitthala
 Hridayaprakasha 
 Hridayakautukam of Hridayanarayanadeva
 Vivekachitamani of Nijagunashivayogi [Chapter on music]
 Sangeetha Samayasara of Parshvadeva 
 Kohalamatam of Kohala 
 Kohala Shiksha 
 Kohala Dattilam 
 Hanumadbharatam of Hanuman 
 Sadashivabharatam of Sadashiva 
 Brahmabharatam of Brahma 
 Svaramelakalanidhi of Ramamatya [Revised 2nd ed.]
 Brihaddeshi of Sri Matangamuni

Original works 

 Nishanka Hridaya
 Pundarikamala
 Bharatanatya: A Critical Study
 Suladis and Ugabhogas of Karnataka Music
 Veenalakshana Vimarshe
 Chikkadevaraya Saptapadi Mattu Geethagopaladalli Sangeetha
 Shruti: The Scalic Foundation
 Music of the Madhva Monks of Karnataka
 Studies in Indian Dance 
 Studies in Music Education
 Karnataka Sangeetha Vahini (2nd Revised Enlarged Ed.)
 Ela: A Musicological Study
 Karnatakadalli Kalegalu : Sangeetha
 Bharatiya Sangeethadalli Paribhashaprayoga
 Mridanga: A Critical Study
 History of Music in Karnataka
 Srutibedha : Principles and Practice 
 Nadayoga: principles and Practice
 You and Karnataka Music
 Research Problems in Karnataka Music
 Percussive Instruments of Karnataka Music
 Makhi Hrdaya
 Karnataka Music as Aesthetic Form
 Dharmika Samskaragalalli Sangita
 Music Criticism: Principles and Practice
 Kohala Matam (in Kannada and English)
 Sangita Sudhakara
 Srividya Shodashika: Chitkala Part I, Part II and Part III
 Naalku Sangita Rajaru 
 Bharata Chatushthaya 
 The Mela Triad of Venkatamakhi
 Ragalakshanam of Muddu Venkatamahin.

Translations and commentary 

 Sangitaratnakara of Sharngadeva [Kannada]
 Chaturdandi Prakashika of Venkatamakhin [Kannada]
 Veenalakshana of Parameshvara [Kannada]
 Sadragachandrodaya of Pandarika Vitthala [Kannada]
 Ragamala of Pandarika Vitthala [Kannada]
 Ragamanjari of Pandarika Vitthala [Kannada] 
 Nartananirnaya of Pandarika Vitthala [Kannada]
 Moorusangeethopanyasagalu [Kannada]
 Hridayaprakasha of Hridayanarayanadeva [English]
 Hridayaprakasham of Hridayanarayanadeva
 Nartananirnaya of Pandarikavitthala [English]
 Svaramelakalanidhi of Ramamatya [English]
 Sangeetha Samayasara of Parshvadeva [English]
 Hanumadbharatam [English] 
 Sadashivabharatam [English] 
 Brihaddeshi of Sri Matangamuni [Kannada]
 Sangeetha Sudhakara of Haripaladeva
 Sangeetha Chudamani of Jagadekamalla
 Suryanamaskara of Sri Raghavendra Swamiji [Kannada]
 Pranayama for Body and Soul of Sri Raghavendra Swamiji [English & Kannada]
 Upanayana (Translation of History of Dharma Shastras by P.V. Kane)
 Vivaha (Translation of History of Dharma Shastras by P.V. Kane)
 Shraddha Karma (Translation of History of Dharma Shastras by P.V. Kane)
 Anyeshthi (Translation of History of Dharma Shastras by P.V. Kane)
 Kohalamatam of Kohalamuni (in Kannada and English - International editions)
 Bharatarnava of Nandikeshwara
 Svaramela Kalanidhi of Ramamatya (in Kannada)

As editor 

 Vedic Octave and Extracts from Abhinava Bharata Sara Sangraha
 Kudumiamalai Inscriptions on Music [Vol.1]
 Souvenir: Silver Jubilee Commemoration, Seethasadana, Mysore
 'Nandanavana': Felicitation Volume dedicated to Sri Raghavendra Swamiji 
 Souvenir: Vishnudigambar Paluskar Centenary Seminar on Hindusthani Music
 Suryanamaskara of Sri Raghavendra Swamiji [Kannada]
 Pranayama of Sri Raghavendra Swamiji
 Shatkarmavidhi of Sri Raghavendra Swamiji
 Angamardhana of Sri Raghavendra Swamiji
 Dehaswasthyakkagi Yogasanagalu of Sri Raghavendra Swamiji
 Rishi Gandharva : Commemorative Volume on Sangeetha Rathna Kanchana Venkatasubrahmanyam
 Historiography of Indian Arts [Music and Dance]: Insights
 Nadabharathi

Miscellaneous work 

More than 170 research papers on various aspects on music and dance presented at conferences, seminars, congresses etc., and others published in periodicals.

More than 200 articles on music, dance, education, philosophy, yoga, tantra, mantra and other Indological disciplines.

Total publication exceeds some 20,000 printed pages. Music, dance and cognate Indological fraternity have treasured these publications to perform, propagate and preserve the culture and traditions of the country.

Awards and honors 

 Academi Rathna fellowship award by Sangit Natak Academi, New Delhi. 
 Rajya Sangita Vidwan Award from Government of Karnataka, 2011
 Madras Music Academy, Chennai, Musicologist Award
 Sangit Natak Academy Award for the Year 2008
 Bharatamuni Samman 2012 from Nalanda Dance Research Centre, Mumbai.
 Madokaram Narasimhachar memorial 'Lifetime Achievement Award' 2011
 Karnataka State Rajyotsava Award
 Veena Rajarao International Award for Excellence in Music
 Karnataka Sangeetha Nrutya Academy Award
 Honorific titles include:
 Mahamahopadhyaya 
 Rashtrabhooshana
 Sangeetha Kala Rathna
 Sangeetha Shastra Sarasvathi
 Sangeetha Sudhakara
 Ganagnanapayonidhi
 Ganashastravidyavaridhi
 Geethanatyakovida
 Karnataka Kala Tilaka 
 Vedashri
 Samhitacharya 
 Sangita Shastra Shiromani 
 Abhinava Bharatacharya and others# 
 Honorific Shawls, ponnadais, Citations and Birudupatras from many Jagadguru Peethas and Mathas.
 Honoured in innumerable Conferences and Seminars on Music and Dance.
 Social and Cultural Organizations.
 Various universities and other academic bodies in India
 Honoured at World Kannada Conference
 Guest of Honour at Golden Jubilee Celebrations of the founding of USSR (Tashkent) and of Silver Jubilee of Composers Union of Music USSR (Samarkand) 
 Felicitated on the eve of International Music Seminar (USSR and India) Moscow.
 International Man of the year 2000, Cambridge, UK
 Director of Research in Music and Arts, ABC, US
 Man of International achievements, US
 Dr. R. Sathyanarayana Abhinandana Samithi Felicitation (formed by the entire artist community and cultural institutions of Karnataka)

References 

1927 births
2020 deaths
Indian musicologists
People from Mysore
Recipients of the Padma Shri
Recipients of the Sangeet Natak Akademi Fellowship
Recipients of the Sangeet Natak Akademi Award